The 1962 Middlesbrough West by-election was held on 6 June 1962 when the incumbent Conservative MP, Sir Jocelyn Simon was appointed as President of the Probate, Divorce and Admiralty Division of the High Court.  The by-election was won by the Labour MP, Jeremy Bray, who retained the gain at the 1964 general election.

Thompson was serving in the British Armed Forces.  The law stated that, on standing in a Parliamentary election, he would be released from the Forces; this was, therefore, a way to receive an early honourable discharge, for the cost of a lost deposit.  This approach was copied by eight candidates in the by-elections held on 22 November, and was banned soon afterwards.

References

By-elections to the Parliament of the United Kingdom in Middlesbrough constituencies
1962 elections in the United Kingdom
1962 in England
1960s in Yorkshire